The Zschopau Valley Railway may refer to one of two railways in the Zschopau Valley:

 Annaberg-Buchholz–Flöha railway
 Walthersdorf–Crottendorf railway